Million Dollar Eel is a 1971 Italian comedy film. It stars actor Gabriele Ferzetti.

Cast
 Ottavia Piccolo	as 	Margherita 'Tina' Tellini
 Lino Toffolo		as 	Giovanni Boscolo 'Bissa'
 Mario Adorf		as 	Nane Mora 
 Rodolfo Baldini		as 	Lino
 Gabriele Ferzetti		as 	Vasco
 Senta Berger		as 	Countess Spodani
 Daniele Dublino	as 	Priest
 Ricky Gianco		as 	Barman

References

External links

1971 films
Italian comedy films
1970s Italian-language films
Films directed by Salvatore Samperi
Films scored by Fiorenzo Carpi
1970s Italian films